Manica hunteri is a species of ant in the family Formicidae.

References

Further reading

 NCBI Taxonomy Browser, Manica hunteri
 Arnett, Ross H. (2000). American Insects: A Handbook of the Insects of America North of Mexico. CRC Press.

Myrmicinae
Insects described in 1914